Jujubinus mabelae is a species of sea snail, a marine gastropod mollusk in the family Trochidae, the top snails.

Description

Distribution
This species occurs in the Atlantic Ocean off the Canary Islands at depths between 5 m and 27 m.

References

External links

mabelae
Gastropods described in 2009